General O'Donnell may refer to:

Emmett O'Donnell Jr. (1906–1971), U.S. Air Force four-star general
Enrique O'Donnell, Conde de La Bisbal (1769–1834), Spanish Army captain general
Joseph O'Donnell (younger) (1768–1836), Spanish Army captain general
Karl O'Donnell (1715–1771), Austrian Army general in the Seven Years' War
Lawrence O'Donnell (general) (born 1933), Australian Army lieutenant general
Leopoldo O'Donnell (1809–1867), Spanish Army captain general
Patrick O'Donnell (Canadian general) (1940–2015), Canadian Forces lieutenant general